A primitive road is a minor road system, used for travel or transportation that is generally not maintained or paved. Primitive roads primarily occur in rural farmlands, deserts, or forests rather than in developed areas.

Classification
A primitive road can be classified if it meets the following criteria:  

 Is not classified as part of the area's primary road system
 Has an average annual daily traffic of one hundred or fewer vehicles.
 Is typically made as non-paved gravel road or dirt road driveway

In the United States most of these roads are maintained by local governments and signed as county highways.

See also
 County road

References

External links
Definition of Primitive Road from the state of Washington.

Types of roads